Helen Chang or Chang Hua-kuan (born 7 July 1954) is a Taiwanese politician. She has served as the Magistrate of Chiayi County since 20 December 2009.

Early life
Chang obtained her bachelor's degree in business administration from National Chung Hsing University and her master's degree in strategic and international affairs from National Chung Cheng University.

Political careers

2008 legislative election
Chang participated in the 2008 legislative election representing Chiayi County 2 constituency.

2009 Chiayi County magistrate election
Chang was elected Magistrate of Chiayi County on 5 December 2009 under the Democratic Progressive Party and assumed office on 20 December 2009. She was reelected for a second term on 29 November 2014.

References

1954 births
Living people
Magistrates of Chiayi County
National Chung Cheng University alumni
National Chung Hsing University alumni
21st-century Taiwanese women politicians
21st-century Taiwanese politicians